Buddleja paniculata is a species of flowering plant in the figwort family Scrophulariaceae,
The species was named by Wallich and introduced to the UK in 1823 as seed sent by Major Madden from the Himalayas to the Glasnevin Botanic Garden.

Description

The sparse terminal panicles comprise white or pale lilac flowers, some forms pleasantly scented, others not, from December to mid-spring.

Cultivation
Owing to its limited horticultural merit, B. paniculata is rarely cultivated. Moreover, it  demands dry soils and frost protection over winter. In the UK, it is grown under glass as part of the NCCPG national collection at Longstock Park Nursery, near Stockbridge. Hardiness: USDA zone 8.

References

Literature
Leeuwenberg, A. J. M. (1979) The Loganiaceae of Africa XVIII Buddleja L. II, Revision of the African & Asiatic species. H. Veenman & Zonen, Wageningen, Nederland.

Li, P. T. & Leeuwenberg, A. J. M. (1996). Loganiaceae, in Wu, Z. & Raven, P. (eds) Flora of China, Vol. 15. Science Press, Beijing, and Missouri Botanical Garden Press, St. Louis, USA.  online at www.efloras.org

paniculata
Flora of Bhutan
Flora of India (region)
Flora of Nepal